Maikki Uotila-Kraatz (born 25 February 1977) is a Finnish former ice dancer. With Toni Mattila, she is the 1997 Finnish national champion and competed in the final segment at the 1996 European Championships.

Personal life 
Uotila was born on 25 February 1977 in Espoo, Finland. She received a Bachelor of Arts in dance from Sarah Lawrence College in New York. In 2004, she settled in Vancouver, British Columbia, Canada. She married Victor Kraatz on June 19, 2004. They have two sons – Oliver (born September 14, 2006) and Henry (born July 10, 2010).

Career

Competitive 
Uotila competed as a single skater until 1994, winning the junior silver medal at the 1992 Nordic Championships. In 1994, she switched to ice dancing, teaming up Toni Mattila. They competed in the free dance at the 1996 European Championships in Sofia, Bulgaria, finishing 23rd. They also appeared at the 1996 World Championships in Edmonton, Alberta, Canada, but were eliminated after the compulsory dances.

After two silver medals, Uotila/Mattila won the Finnish national title in the 1996–1997 season. They placed 26th at the 1997 European Championships in Paris, France. They were coached by Arja Wuorivirta and Martin Skotnicky. They ended their partnership in 1997 after three seasons together.

Uotila competed with Michel Bigras in the 1997–1998 season.

Post-competitive 
Uotila coaches ice dancing at the BC Centre of Excellence. She has also worked as a dance instructor at the Shadbolt Centre for the Arts in Burnaby.

Programs 
(with Mattila)

Competitive highlights

Ice dancing with Bigras

Ice dancing with Mattila

Ladies' singles

References

External links
 The Figure Skating Corner: Uotila & Mattila

Navigation

Finnish female ice dancers
1977 births
Finnish emigrants to Canada
Living people
Sportspeople from Espoo